Placiphorella, the veiled chiton, is a genus of polyplacophoran molluscs with precephalic tentacles, which are used in feeding.

See also 
Image

References

Chiton genera